The coat of arms of Poland is a white, crowned eagle with a golden beak and talons, on a red background.

In Poland, the coat of arms as a whole is referred to as godło both in official documents and colloquial speech, despite the fact that other coats of arms are usually called a herb (e.g. the Nałęcz herb or the coat of arms of Finland). This stems from the fact that in Polish heraldry, the word godło (plural: godła) means only a heraldic charge (in this particular case a white crowned eagle) and not an entire coat of arms, but it is also an archaic word for a national symbol of any sort. In later legislation only the herb retained this designation; it is unknown why.

Legal basis 
The coat of arms of the Republic of Poland is described in two legal documents: the Constitution of the Republic of Poland of 1997 and the Coat of Arms, Colors and Anthem of the Republic of Poland, and State Seals Act (Ustawa o godle, barwach i hymnie Rzeczypospolitej Polskiej oraz o pieczęciach państwowych) of 1980 with subsequent amendments (henceforth referred to as "the Coat of Arms Act").

Legislation concerning the national symbols is far from perfect. The Coat of Arms Act has been amended several times and refers extensively to executive ordinances, some of which have never been issued. Moreover, the Act contains errors, omissions and inconsistencies which make the law confusing, open to various interpretations and often not followed in practice.

Design 

According to Chapter I, Article 28, paragraph 1 of the Constitution, the coat of arms of Poland is an image of a crowned white eagle in a red field. The Coat of Arms Act, Article 4, further specifies that the crown, as well as the eagle's beak and talons, are golden. The eagle's wings are outstretched and its head is turned to its right. In English heraldic terminology, the arms are blazoned as Gules an eagle crowned, beaked and armed Or. In contrast to classic heraldry, where the same blazon may be rendered into varying designs, the Coat of Arms Act allows only one official rendering of the national coat of arms. The official design may be found in attachment no. 1 to the Coat of Arms Act.

The nearly circular charge, i.e., the image of the white eagle, is highly stylized. The heraldic bird is depicted with its wings and legs outstretched, its head turned to the right, in a pose known in heraldry as 'displayed'. The eagle's plumage, as well as its tongue and leg scales are white with gradient shading suggestive of a bas-relief. Each wing is adorned with a curved band extending from the bird's torso to the upper edge of the wing, terminating in a heraldic cinquefoil. Note that a cinquefoil is a stylized five-leafed plant, not a star. Three of its leaves are embossed like a trefoil (note similar trefoils in the medieval designs of the eagle). In heraldic terms, the eagle is "armed", that is to say, its beak and talons are rendered in gold, in contrast to the body. The crown on the eagle's head consists of a base and three fleurons extending from it. The base is adorned with three roughly rectangular gemstones. The fleuronsof which the two outer ones are only partly visiblehave the shape of a fleur-de-lis. The entire crown, including the gems, as well as spaces between the fleurons, is rendered in gold.

The charge is placed in an escutcheon (shield) of the Modern French type. It is a nearly rectangular upright isosceles trapezoid, rounded at the bottom, whose upper base is slightly longer than the lower one, from the middle of which extends downwards a pointed tip. Although the shield is an integral part of the coat of arms, Polish law stipulates, in certain cases, to only use the charge without the escutcheon. The shades of the principal tinctures, white (Argent) and red (Gules), which are the national colors of Poland, are specified as coordinates in the CIE 1976 color space (see Flag of PolandNational colors for details).

History 
According to legend, the White Eagle emblem originated when Poland's legendary founder Lech saw a white eagle's nest. When he looked at the bird, a ray of sunshine from the red setting sun fell on its wings, so they appeared tipped with gold, the rest of the eagle was pure white. He was delighted and decided to settle there and placed the eagle on his emblem. He also named the place Gniezdno (currently Gniezno) from the Polish word gniazdo ("nest").

The symbol of an eagle appeared for the first time on the coins made during the reign of Bolesław I (992-1025), initially as the coat of arms of the Piast dynasty. Beginning in the 12th century, the eagle has appeared on the shields, ensigns, coins, and seals of the Piast dukes. It appeared on the Polish coat of arms during Przemysł II reign as a reminder of the Piast tradition before the fragmentation of Poland.

The eagle's graphic form has changed throughout centuries. Its recent shape, accepted in 1927, was designed by professor Zygmunt Kamiński and was based on the eagle's form from the times of Stefan Batory's reign. It was adapted to stamps or round shields rather than to a rectangular shape.

The arms of the Polish–Lithuanian Commonwealth was quartered, with Polish eagle and Lithuanian Pahonia on opposite sides. Kings used to place their own emblems in the center of the national coat of arms (i.e., House Vasa).

Despite the fact that new emblems were given to provinces established by the invaders after the partitions of Poland, the White Eagle remained there with or without crown and occasionally with face turned towards left and in some exceptions with Pahonia. But in most cases they were combined with the invader's emblem.

The Poles conscientiously collected coins from the pre-partitions period with the eagle on their obverse and reverse. The symbol of the eagle, often with Pahonia, appeared on numerous flags and emblems of the November Uprising.

The resurrection of the Polish Kingdom (Polish Regency) in the territories of the former Congress Poland (which had been partitioned and annexed by the Russian Empire as the Vistula Land in 1867) was approved by Austria-Hungary and Wilhelm II's Germany in 1916. A year later, the first Polish banknotes (Polish Marka) with Crowned Eagle on an indivisible shield were introduced. After regaining total independence and the creation of the Second Polish Republic (1918–1939) the White Eagle was implemented by the act of 1919. Official image of the coat of arms (which resembled the emblem of Stanislaus Augustus) was used until 1927 when Zygmunt Kamiński designed a new one. According to the research of Polish heraldist Jerzy Michta published in 2017, the version designed by Kamiński was actually plagiarized from a 1924 medal by Elisa Beetz-Charpentier made in honor of Ignacy Paderewski.

After World War II, the communist authorities of the Polish People's Republic removed the reactionary royal crown from the eagle's head. Still, Poland was one of the few countries in the Eastern Bloc with no communist symbols (red stars, ears of wheat, hammers, etc.) on either its flag or its coat of arms. The crownless design was approved by resolution in 1955. To counter that, the Polish government in Exile introduced a new emblem with a cross added atop the crown. After the fall of communism in 1989, the crown came back, but without the cross.

The eagle appears on many public administration buildings, it is present in schools and courts. Furthermore, it is placed on the obverse of Polish coins.  However the issue on which conditions it should be exposed and how it should be interpreted is the topic of numerous debates in Poland. The eagle was formerly on the Poland national football team's shirts; a new shirt without the eagle was introduced in November 2011, prompting complaints from fans and president Bronisław Komorowski. Due to this overwhelming public pressure, the football shirts were redesigned with the eagle reinstated in the centre of the shirt in December 2011.

Evolution

Kings of Poland

Restored Poland

Communist Poland

Third Polish Republic

Military Eagle

See also 

 Banner of Poland
 Coat of arms of Lithuania
 Coat of arms of Congress Poland
 Coat of arms of the Polish–Lithuanian Commonwealth
 List of Polish nobility coats of arms images
 Flag of Poland
 Order of the White Eaglethe highest order in Polish honours system.
 Polish coins and banknotes
 Polish military eagle
 Polish heraldry

References

External links 

 Jan Rękawek, The White Eagle

Poland
Polish coats of arms
National symbols of Poland
Poland
Poland
Poland